B. crassifolia  may refer to:
 Barbosella crassifolia, an orchid species
 Beauprea crassifolia, a plant species endemic to New Caledonia
 Bergenia crassifolia, a plant species
 Byrsonima crassifolia, a flowering plant species native to tropical America